Angiolo Torchi (Massa Lombarda, Lombardy, November, 1856 - 1915) was an Italian painter, mainly of landscapes. He is also known as Angelo Torchi under which Wikipedia has articles in Italian and French.

He began his studies a Florence under the professor Lorenzo Gelati, then moved to Naples to work with Alceste Campriani. He painted his landscapes and figures outdoors. He frequently exhibited at the Promotrice of Florence; but also in Milan in 1881, Rome in 1883, Turin in 1884, Venice, Bologna, and lastly Paris.

Among his works: three studies of Canals in Venice; Under the Grapevines in Capri; Various studies on Vedute of Mergellina. Among his genre works are In risaia dopo il raccolto. To an Exposition of Paris, he displayed a study of a Roman Peasant. He painted numerous studies, across seasons, of the Arno in Florence, and of the Gabbro near Livorno, and of the railway line of the Apennine Porrettano, and of the Maremma Toscana. He also painted portraits. Other works include: Sotto la pineta; A Mergellina; Alle Cascine (June Morning); Dopo il raccolto; March Sun; Naples alla villa reale; Livorno on the Beach; Near Massa Lombarda; Marine Study a Castiglioncello; Nel greto del Mugnone; Alla Porretta in July; San Vincenzo; July Morning; and Via Lorenzo il Magnifico in Florence. By the 1891 Exhibition of the Promotrice of Florence, his technique reflected impressionistic styles. In 1891, he displayed: Impressions of a Market; Fra settembre e ottobre; Along the canal of Massa Lombarda; Ulivi siti mare; Riso sull' Aia; Last Rays of Sunlight; Forte San Giuliano (Genoa) and Pergolato sul mare.

References

1856 births
1915 deaths
People from Massa Lombarda
19th-century Italian painters
Italian male painters
Painters from Tuscany
20th-century Italian painters
19th-century Italian male artists
20th-century Italian male artists